Tan-Kenneth Jerico Leka-Schmidt (born 3 June 2002), known as Kenneth Schmidt, is a German footballer who plays as a centre-back for SC Freiburg.

International career
Schmidt has represented Germany at youth international level.

Career statistics

References

2002 births
Living people
German footballers
Association football defenders
Germany youth international footballers
Regionalliga players
3. Liga players
FC Emmendingen players
SC Freiburg players
SC Freiburg II players
Sportspeople from Freiburg im Breisgau
Footballers from Baden-Württemberg